Kyle D. Hoffman (born June 11, 1971) is an American politician who represents the 116th District in the Kansas House of Representatives, and serves as the Chairman of the House Agriculture Committee.  He was first elected in 2010.

Hoffman previously served as the Chairman of the House Agriculture & Natural Resources Budget Committee from January 2015 until January 2017. He also is the former Majority Caucus Chairman in the Kansas House.

References 

1971 births
Living people
Republican Party members of the Kansas House of Representatives
21st-century American politicians